Greater Antalya refers to the immediate city and centre of the Antalya, Turkey and hence operates as a municipality and administrative area. It has a population of roughly one million. It may be used in contrast to Outer Antalya.

Antalya